In Samoan mythology Fa'atiu is the wind and storm god. In one Samoan legend, Tiʻitiʻi imprisons the winds one by one in his canoe or calabash, leaving only Fisaga free.

References

Samoan deities
Sky and weather gods
Wind deities